Ramla Redoubt, also known as Vendôme Redoubt, was a redoubt in Ramla Bay, limits of Xagħra on the island of Gozo, Malta. It was built by the Order of Saint John in 1715–1716 as one of a series of coastal fortifications around the Maltese Islands. The redoubt no longer exists, but a small part of its foundations are still visible.

History
Ramla Redoubt was built in 1715–1716 as part of the first building programme of coastal batteries and redoubts in Malta. It was located in the centre of Ramla Bay. The bay included other fortifications, namely Ramla Left Battery and Ramla Right Battery on the either side of the bay, and an entrenchment wall linking both batteries with the redoubt. Ramla Bay was further defended by Marsalforn Tower on the plateau above the bay, and an underwater barrier to prevent enemy ships from landing within the bay.

The redoubt originally consisted of a pentagonal platform with a low parapet. A rectangular blockhouse was located at the centre of its gorge.

In 1881, a statue of the Madonna was built on the site of the redoubt.

Present day

Today, all that remains of the redoubt is a small section of its pentagonal platform near the base of the 19th century statue. These remains, along with the rest of Ramla Bay, are managed by the Gaia Foundation.

References

External links
National Inventory of the Cultural Property of the Maltese Islands

Redoubts in Malta
Hospitaller fortifications in Malta
Military installations established in 1715
Demolished buildings and structures in Malta
Xagħra
Limestone buildings in Malta
National Inventory of the Cultural Property of the Maltese Islands
18th-century fortifications
1715 establishments in Malta
18th Century military history of Malta